Deuces Wild is a 2002 American crime drama film directed by Scott Kalvert and written by Paul Kimatian and Christopher Gambale, who also created the story. The film stars Stephen Dorff, Brad Renfro, James Franco, Matt Dillon, and Fairuza Balk.

Martin Scorsese was originally the executive producer (as a favor to Paul Kimatian), but he eventually removed his name from this film. It was the final film of cinematographer John A. Alonzo before his death in 2001.

Plot
Leon and Bobby Anthony are brothers and members of the Deuces, a Brooklyn street gang who protect their neighborhood of Sunset Park. Ever since the death of their youngest brother Alphonse "Allie Boy" from a drug overdose at the hands of Marco, the leader of the Vipers, a neighboring rival street gang, they fiercely keep drugs off their turf. This puts them in strong opposition to the Vipers, who want to continue to sell drugs in the neighborhood. On the eve of Marco's return from a three-year stint in prison, a gang war seems imminent, as the Deuces violently retaliate with suspicion against Vipers muscleman and bookie Philly, who ekes out a vacant nightclub to establish business down the block. Marco, along with hoping to re-establish his drug pushing enterprise, plans revenge against Leon, whom he believes ratted him out to the police for selling the killing "hot shot" to Alphonse.

Bobby falls for a new girl who moves in across the street, Annie, the uninvolved younger sister of Jimmy "Pockets", a Vipers member and heroin dealer, who takes care of their elderly dementia ailing mother. Their attraction for each other complicates the gang rivalry, especially with Leon, who mistakenly fears, feels Annie may be using Bobby. After jumping Deuces member Jackie in kind for the earlier attack, causing more gang fights in the neighborhood, Marco begins his activities again and allows the Vipers to rampage and terrorize residents across the block to establish his return for good. Later, Marco and the Vipers intimidate Bobby while on a date at the beach with Annie, before beating and raping Betsy (Leon's girlfriend) to push him over the edge.

After Leon runs a car through the Viper's main hangout, neighborhood Mafioso Fritzy orders Leon and Marco to make amends; unopposed to Marco's drug dealing, knowing he can profit off of his racket and without appeal to Leon's cause to keep the neighborhood safe, Leon and Marco agree to a gang war, much to Fritzy's disappointment. Annie defends her mother from another one of Jimmy's outbursts with a kitchen knife and having enough of their troubled life in Brooklyn, wishes to run away with Bobby and her mother. As the Deuces and the Vipers meet at the docks for their confrontation, battle ensues. Marco is killed by Leon in a duel, being saved by tag-along kid Scooch, while Jimmy Pockets is shot and killed by Philly, who accuses him of stealing the gang's stash of money. Leon is shot and killed by one of Fritzy's men in retaliation for ignoring his orders.

At Leon's funeral, Bobby and the gang, along with his and Annie's mother, pay their last respects to Leon. In a small epilogue, Bobby explains that his mother will go to live with their uncle in Long Island, he and Annie are free to take her mother to Los Angeles to start anew, gives Scooch and Father Aldo of the nearby Catholic church part of the stolen stash of money to invest and that after the funeral, this would be the last time he would see the Deuces again, as gangs throughout Brooklyn would eventually disappear. Before leaving, Bobby drops a wheelbarrow full of cinder blocks on Fritzy's car, presumably killing him, to uphold Leon's word that "there would be no more junk on the streets".

Cast

 Stephen Dorff as Leon Anthony
 Brad Renfro as Bobby Anthony
 Fairuza Balk as Annie "The Ice Cube" Pockets
 Vincent Pastore as Father Aldo
 Frankie Muniz as "Scooch"
 Balthazar Getty as Jimmy "Pockets"
 Matt Dillon as "Fritzy"
 Norman Reedus as Marco Vendetti
 Max Perlich as Freddie
 Drea de Matteo as Betsy
 Louis Lombardi as Philly "Babe"
 Deborah Harry as Wendy
 James Franco as Tino Verona
 Josh Leonard as "Punchy"
 Johnny Knoxville as Vinnie "Fish"
 George Georgiadis as Willie
 Jackie Tohn as Mary Ann

Production
The film was shot in Los Angeles, California and New York City, New York during 2000. Originally the film would be released in September 2001, but due to the 9/11 attacks it was pushed back to 2002.

Reception
The film received negative reviews and currently holds a 3% rating on Rotten Tomatoes.

Box office
In its opening weekend the film grossed $1,020,000 million in 1,480 theaters in the United States and Canada, debuting number 6 of box office. Deuces Wild grossed $6,080,065 domestically and $202,381 internationally for a worldwide total of $6,282,446.

Accolades

Home media
The film was released in DVD on August 6, 2002, and also in Blu-Ray on September 22, 2015.

References

External links
 
 
 
 
 

2002 films
2002 crime drama films
2000s crime drama films
American crime drama films
American gang films
American gangster films
American independent films
Films set in Brooklyn
Films set in the 1950s
Films set in 1955
Films set in 1958
Films shot in Los Angeles
Films set in New York City
Films shot in New York City
Metro-Goldwyn-Mayer films
United Artists films
Films scored by Stewart Copeland
Films about brothers
2000s English-language films
2000s American films